7-O-Methylluteone is a prenylated isoflavone. It can be found in the bark of Erythrina burttii.

The enzyme monoprenyl isoflavone epoxidase uses 7-O-methylluteone, NADPH, H+ and O2 to produce a dihydrofurano pyranoisoflavone derivative, NADP+ and H2O.

References 

O-methylated isoflavones
Prenylflavonoids